James Edward Houston (November 3, 1937 – September 11, 2018) was an American football linebacker who played 13 seasons in the National Football League (NFL) with the Cleveland Browns. He was elected to the College Football Hall of Fame in 2005.

College career
Houston played for the Ohio State Buckeyes as an end.  He was a three-year starter under head coach Woody Hayes and twice the team MVP.  He was elected the team captain as a senior.  

Houston contributed on both offense and defense.  Although known primarily for his excellent blocking and tackling, he helped the Buckeyes win a National Championship in 1957 (as recognized by the Coaches poll), and was also the leading receiver on the 1959 team, including a 100-yard game that year against Michigan State.  He was an All-America selection in 1958 and 1959.

Houston was inducted into the Ohio State Varsity O Hall of Fame in 1979, and was named to the Ohio State Football All-Century Team as a defensive end in 2000.

Professional career
Houston was chosen in the first round of both the AFL draft by the Buffalo Bills and the NFL draft by the Cleveland Browns.  Like his older brother Lin Houston, Jim chose the Browns.  He originally played as a defensive end under head coach Paul Brown, but later moved to linebacker under Blanton Collier.  At linebacker he became a four-time Pro Bowl selection, and helped the Browns win the 1964 NFL Championship.

Later Life
Houston died on September 11, 2018 at his home in Sagamore Hills of complications of dementia and amyotrophic lateral sclerosis (ALS).  An autopsy conducted at Boston University found he had advanced (Stage 3) chronic traumatic encephalopathy.

Legacy
Houston was one of the few players to achieve the "triple crown" of football - winning a state championship in high school (Massillon), a National Championship in college (Ohio State), and an NFL Championship in the professional ranks (Cleveland Browns),. all within his home state.

Awards and honors
1953 OHSAA Football Championship
1957 National Championship (Coaches poll}
1964 NFL Championship
Four-time Pro Bowl selection
College Football Hall of Fame (class of 2005)

References

1937 births
2018 deaths
Deaths from motor neuron disease
Neurological disease deaths in Ohio
American football linebackers
Cleveland Browns players
Ohio State Buckeyes football players
American Conference Pro Bowl players
College Football Hall of Fame inductees
Eastern Conference Pro Bowl players
Sportspeople from Massillon, Ohio
Players of American football from Ohio